Badeshi is an extinct unclassified Indo-Iranian language spoken in Pakistan. Its distinctiveness is unconfirmed; it may be a family name. According to Ethnologue, Badeshi is extinct but in 2018 the BBC found three men who could still speak the language.

Muhammad Zaman Sagar, a field linguist connected to the Forum for Language Initiative, has worked on this language. But as a result of his research during two years, he collected only about one hundred words. In July 2007, he visited the Bishigram Valley again and spent some days with the people there. There are efforts to retain a record of the language by linguist Zubair Torwali among others.

In 2018, BBC reporters found three old men (Said Gul, Ali Sher and Rahim Gul) who could still speak Badeshi in the Bishigram Valley in Northern Pakistan.  They said that the Torwali language had taken over from Badeshi in their village.  The men also had worked in tourist areas in the Swat valley where they spoke Pashto.  Some phrases of Badeshi were:
  - My name is Rahim Gul
  - I speak Badeshi
  - How do you do?
  - I have eaten
  - There is not much snowfall this year

References

External links
 The Badeshi People in Bishigram and Tirat valley, Swat
 Badeshi: Only three people speak this 'extinct' language
 Badeshi bible scripture

Languages of Khyber Pakhtunkhwa
Indo-Aryan languages